Empress Ashina (阿史那皇后, personal name unknown) (551–582) was an empress of the Xianbei-led Chinese Northern Zhou dynasty. She was the daughter of Göktürk's Muqan Qaghan, and her husband was Emperor Wu.

Biography
She was born in 551, shortly before her grandfather Tumen (Bumin Qaghan), initially a vassal of Rouran, declared independence from Rouran and establishing a separate Göktürk state as its Illig Qaghan. Göktürk soon conquered most of Rouran, taking over as the main power over the steppes to the north of the Chinese states Western Wei and Eastern Wei (and their successor states, respectively Northern Zhou and Northern Qi).  Because of this, Yuwen Tai, the paramount general of Western Wei, made repeated alliance overtures to Tujue, and initially, Ashina Qijin, who took over the throne in 554 after the death of his brother, the Issik Qaghan, agreed to give a daughter to him in marriage, but soon revoked the agreement.  After Yuwen Tai's death in 556, his son Yuwen Jue seized the throne from Emperor Gong of Western Wei in spring 557, ending Western Wei and establishing Northern Zhou as its Emperor Xiaomin, and subsequently, after Emperor Xiaomin's younger brother Emperor Wu took the throne in 560, he resumed the marriage overture with Tujue, and Ashina Qijin agreed.

In 565, Emperor Wu sent a delegation of 120 people led by his brother Yuwen Chun (宇文純) the Duke of Chen to Tujue to escort Ashina Qijin's daughter back to Northern Zhou, but Ashina Qijin again revoked his offer and instead considered an alliance with Northern Qi, detaining Yuwen Chun and the rest of the delegation.  In or before 568, a major storm inflicted damage on Ashina Qijin's royal tent, and Ashina Qijin took this as a sign of divine disapproval on his revocation of the marriage offer, and so permitted Yuwen Chun to escort his daughter to Northern Zhou.  In 568, when she arrived at the Northern Zhou capital Chang'an, Emperor Wu personally welcomed her and created her his empress.  Empress Ashina was said to be beautiful and appropriate in her actions, and Emperor Wu honored her but was said to not favor her, until his niece Lady Dou (the daughter of his sister the Princess Xiangyang and the official Dou Yi (竇毅) the Duke of Shenwu), around 572, reminded him of Tujue's power and that he still had to face the rivals Northern Qi and Chen dynasty, and that he needed to show the empress greater favor to appease her home state.  He agreed.  However, they had no children together.

In 578, Emperor Wu died, and his son Yuwen Yun (by Consort Li Ezi) took the throne as Emperor Xuan.  He honored both Empress Ashina and his mother Consort Li as empress dowagers.  In 579, after Emperor Xuan had passed the throne to his son Emperor Jing and taken for himself the atypical title Tianyuan Shanghuang (天元上皇, a variation of Taishang Huang (retired emperor)), he honored her as "Empress Dowager Tianyuan" (天元皇太后 (Tianyuan Huang Taihou), later 天元上皇太后 (Tianyuan Shang Huang Taihou)).  After he died in 580, Emperor Jing honored her as grand empress dowager.  She survived Northern Zhou's usurpation by Emperor Xuan's father-in-law Yang Jian in 581 (as Yang Jian established Sui dynasty as its Emperor Wen), and while Yang Jian killed most of Northern Zhou's imperial house, she was not harmed.  She died on 23 April 582 and was buried with honors due an empress with her husband Emperor Wu on 29 April 582.

Tomb 
Her tomb was found in 1993 on Chenma village, Xianyang. The tomb was raided numerous times by looters, but several of artifacts, including her golden seal were recovered by Shenyang police. Empress Ashina's golden seal is the earliest known seal in existence, made in 579–580 with inscription "Empress Dowager Tianyuan" (天元皇太后) in large seal script.

Genetics 
The first genetic analysis on the Empress Ashina in 2023 by Xiaoming Yang et al. found nearly exclusively Northeast Asian ancestry (97,7%) next to minor West-Eurasian components (2,7%). The ancient Türkic royal family of the Göktürk Khaganate was found to share genetic affinities to post-Iron Age Tungusic and Mongolic pastoralists, while having heterogeneous relationships towards various Turkic-speaking groups, suggesting genetic heterogeneity and multiple sources of origin for the population of the Turkic Khaganate. According to the authors, these findings "once again validates a cultural diffusion model over a demic diffusion model for the spread of Turkic languages" and refutes "the western Eurasian origin and multiple origin hypotheses" in favor of an East Asian origin for the Türks.

Notes

References 
 Book of Zhou, vol. 9.
 History of Northern Dynasties, vol. 14.
 Zizhi Tongjian, vols. 169, 170, 171, 173, 174.

|- style="text-align: center;"

|-

|-

Göktürk people
Northern Zhou empresses
551 births
582 deaths
Sui dynasty people
Chinese grand empresses dowager
6th-century Chinese women
6th-century Chinese people